Nemotelus notatus, the flecked snout, is a European species of soldier fly.

Description
Length 5–6,5 mm.
Male: the snout (rostellum) is short;the abdomen is white with black basal and apical spots and with a spot on the third segment (Seguy "sternites I-IV tachés de noir"), the venter is white with a black marginal spot. Female: the snout (rostellum) is short; the white spots above the antennae are triangular, not oblique and widely separated in the middle.

Biology
The flight period is June to August. Habitats are salt marshes and other salt grounds. Larvae in saline water bodies. Adults are flower feeders on Crepis Cirsium, Senecio, Tripolium pannonicum and umbellifers and....

Distribution
Northern and Central Europe, from southern Sweden to southern Germany and Austria. Siberia. Finland.

References

Stratiomyidae
Diptera of Europe
Insects described in 1842
Taxa named by Johan Wilhelm Zetterstedt